Area code 719 is a telephone area code in the North American Numbering Plan (NANP) for the state of Colorado. The numbering plan area includes Colorado Springs, Pueblo, Monument, Leadville, Alamosa, Monte Vista, the San Luis Valley, Cañon City, Trinidad, Rocky Ford, La Junta, Walsenburg and southeastern Colorado.  It was created in a split of area code 303 on March 5, 1988. While 303 had been Colorado's sole area code for 40 years, the state's explosive growth in the second half of the 20th century made it apparent that the state would need another area code. 719 was split off when an impending number shortage meant the split could no longer be staved off.

Prior to October 2021, area code 719 had telephone numbers assigned for the central office code 988. In 2020, 988 was designated nationwide as a dialing code for the National Suicide Prevention Lifeline, which created a conflict for exchanges that permit seven-digit dialing. This area code was therefore scheduled to transition to ten-digit dialing by October 24, 2021.

See also
 List of Colorado area codes

References

External links

719
719